is a sub-kilometer near-Earth asteroid classified under the Aten group. It was discovered on 31 January 2019, by the Zwicky Transient Facility at the Palomar Observatory.

Orbit and classification 
It has an orbital eccentricity of 0.659 and a low inclination of 1.44 degrees to the ecliptic. The orbit of  extends from 0.21 AU at perihelion to 1.01 AU at aphelion, crossing the orbits of Mercury, Venus, and Earth. As a result, it frequently makes close passes to these planets.

Despite this small Earth MOID, a possible collision with Earth in the next 100 years has been ruled out by NASA's Sentry impact prediction system. With an absolute magnitude of 25.1,  is too small to be classified as a potentially hazardous object.

Close approaches 
On 30 January 2019, one day prior to its discovery,  made a close pass by the Moon and Earth from within .

Physical characteristics 

See also 
 List of asteroid close approaches to Earth in 2019

References

External links 
 
 
 

Mercury-crossing asteroids
Venus-crossing asteroids
Minor planet object articles (unnumbered)
Discoveries by the Zwicky Transient Facility
Near-Earth objects in 2019
20190131